Jimmy Rogers (born 1988/1989) is an American football coach and former player who is currently the head coach for the South Dakota State Jackrabbits of the Missouri Valley Football Conference (MVFC). After playing college football for the Jackrabbits, he served as a graduate assistant with them for two years before joining Florida Atlantic in 2012. He returned to South Dakota State in 2013 as linebackers coach, later receiving a promotion to defensive coordinator in 2019, the position he served in until being named head coach in 2023.

Early life and education
A native of Chandler, Arizona, Rogers attended Hamilton High School where he was a three-year letterman in football. He was the region defensive player of the year in 2004 and was named first-team all-state. He compiled 320 career tackles and also made 16 sacks and eight interceptions while helping the team win back-to-back state titles in his junior and senior years.

Rogers played college football for the South Dakota State Jackrabbits, enrolling in 2005 and spending his first year as a redshirt. As a redshirt-freshman in 2006, he appeared in all 11 games and posted 43 tackles, placing ninth on the team. In a game against UC Davis that season, he recorded 15 tackles, the highest for any South Dakota State player on the year.

In 2007, Rogers started all 11 games and posted 110 tackles, leading both the team and the conference and earning first-team All-Great West Football Conference (GWFC) honors. He was named second-team All-Missouri Valley Football Conference (MVFC) as a junior in 2008 after starting all 12 games and recording 93 tackles. As a senior, Rogers was team captain and tallied 66 tackles, helping them reach the FCS playoffs. He finished his college career with 312 stops in 46 games played. He additionally forced three fumbles and intercepted three passes.

Coaching career
Rogers began a coaching career shortly after graduating from South Dakota State, serving as a graduate assistant from 2010 to 2011 at the school. He assisted the defensive backs in his first year before moving on to the linebackers in 2011, additionally assisting the special teams. In 2012, he became a graduate assistant for the Florida Atlantic Owls, working with the offensive line in his first year and spending early 2013 with the linebackers.

Rogers returned to South Dakota State for the 2013 season and served as linebackers coach. After serving in the position from 2013 through 2018, he was given the additional roles of co-defensive coordinator and assistant head coach in 2019, while remaining linebackers coach. By the start of the 2022 season, Rogers had coached at least one 100-tackle linebacker in all but one of his nine years in the position. He became the sole defensive coordinator for the 2022 season and helped the Jackrabbits defense lead the FCS in rushing defense and interceptions, while having the third-lowest points allowed. He was named the FCS Coordinator of the Year as South Dakota State went on to win the national championship over North Dakota State. After John Stiegelmeier resigned following 26 seasons in 2023, Rogers was named the new Jackrabbits head coach.

Personal life
Rogers is married and has two children.

References

1980s births
Living people
American football linebackers
Florida Atlantic Owls football coaches
South Dakota State Jackrabbits football players
South Dakota State Jackrabbits football coaches
Sportspeople from Chandler, Arizona
Coaches of American football from Arizona
Players of American football from Arizona